Frances Cecil, Countess of Exeter may refer to: 

 Frances Cecil, Countess of Exeter (died 1663) (1580–1663), English noblewoman, wife of Thomas Smith (English judge) and Thomas Cecil, 1st Earl of Exeter
 Frances Cecil, Countess of Exeter (died 1669) (1630–1669), English noblewoman, wife of John Cecil, 4th Earl of Exeter

See also
 Countess of Exeter (disambiguation)